Cóndores de Cundinamarca is a Colombian professional basketball team located in Chía, Cundinamarca, Colombia. The team currently competes in the Baloncesto Profesional Colombiano league.

Notable players
To appear in this section a player must have either:
 Set a club record or won an individual award as a professional player.
 Played at least one official international match for his senior national team or one NBA game at any time.
 Freddy Asprilla
 Rodrigo Caicedo
 Stalin Ortiz
 Paul Davis

References

External links
Presentation at Latinbasket.com

Videos
Cóndores de Cundinamarca en la copa profesional de baloncesto 

Basketball teams in Colombia
Basketball teams established in 2013
Cundinamarca Department
Tourist attractions in Cundinamarca Department